Paul Lachlan MacKendrick (February 11, 1914 in Taunton, Massachusetts – February 10, 1998 in Madison, Wisconsin) was an American classicist, author, and teacher.

Biography
MacKendrick was born in Taunton, Massachusetts, but most of his productive years had been lived in Madison, Wisconsin.

MacKendrick was educated at Harvard University (1934 B.A., summa cum laude; 1937 M.A.; 1938 Ph.D.) and Balliol College, Oxford, after which he taught at Phillips Academy for some years. Future United States President George H. W. Bush was a student of MacKendrick's while he taught at Phillips Academy. He joined the U.S. Naval Reserve and served from 1941–45.

He taught at Harvard in 1946 and then moved to University of Wisconsin–Madison as Assistant Professor of Classics where he taught for six years. MacKendrick was named a Professor of Classics in 1952 and in 1975, the Lily Ross Taylor Professor of Classics. In all, he taught at the University of Wisconsin from 1946 to 1984.

In 1952, he worked with Herbert M. Howe on the publication of Classics in Translation, an anthology of selections by ancient Greek and Roman writers. In 1958, two books followed: The Ancient World, co-authored with Vincent M. Scramuzza and The Roman Mind At Work.

He is most widely known for a series of books that utilise the discoveries of archeology to reconstruct the histories of particular cultures or civilizations. The first of these, The Mute Stones Speak, surveys the cultures of the Italian peninsula from prehistoric times, with emphasis on the Romans, to the adoption of Christianity as the official religion of the empire in 324 A.D.

The Greek Stones Speak followed in 1962. Starting with Troy and Heinrich Schliemann's excavations, the reader is told of excavations of major centers of the Hellenic world, including the story of Michael Ventris' decipherment of Linear B.

Several additional titles appeared in this series, and by 1980 it had surveyed regions and cultures of almost the entire area of the Roman Empire.

Professor MacKendrick had retired from teaching in 1984.

Honors
Fulbright Fellowship, 1950–51
Guggenheim Fellowship, 1957–58
Consultant, Greek archeology, National Broadcasting Company
Consultant, Roman archeology, Time-Life, Inc.

Awards
1984 Notable Wisconsin Authors - Wisconsin Library Association Literary Awards Committee

Selected books
Classics In Translation (with Herbert M. Howe), 1952
The Ancient World (with Vincent M. Scramuzza), 1958
The Roman Mind At Work, 1958
The Mute Stones Speak, 1960
The Greek Stones Speak, 1962
The Iberian Stones Speak, 1969
The Athenian Aristocracy, 339-31 B.C., 1969
Romans On The Rhine, 1970
Roman France, 1972
The Dacian Stones Speak, Chapel Hill: University of North Carolina Press, 1975. 
The North African Stones Speak, 1980

Notes

External links
 

Historians of antiquity
University of Wisconsin–Madison faculty
Harvard University alumni
Alumni of Balliol College, Oxford
United States Navy personnel of World War II
Clan Henderson
People from Taunton, Massachusetts
Writers from Wisconsin
1914 births
1998 deaths
20th-century American historians
American male non-fiction writers
Historians from Massachusetts
United States Navy reservists
20th-century American male writers